The Gallery Laure Roynette, 20, rue de Thorigny 75003 Paris, is an art gallery located in Paris, specialized in contemporary art.

Artists represented by the Gallery 
Jean-Baptiste Boyer
 Géraldine Cario
 Anaïs de Chabaneix
 
 
 Anne Cindric
 Régis Crozat
 Marion Davout
 Alain Deswarte
 Maëlle Labussière
 Noëlle
 Nicolas Tourte
 Romina de Novellis
 Pascal Ravel
 Monica Sanchez Robles
 Emilie Bazus
 Adrianna Wallis
 Clémence Veilhan 
 François Fries 
 Woda 
 Luo Dan

The Gallery 
In Le Marais, Paris, the Gallery Laure Roynette propose the work of French and strangers emergents Artists. Two of its artists are present in the ranking of the most influent French Artists: Pascal Ravel and Maëlle Labussière. 
The Gallery Laure Roynette has presented in 2012 : Arnaud Cohen with the exposition Une archéologie du contemporain / Ruins of now, and Anne Cindric with the exposition Missing in action « Une aspiration à la consolation : c’est ce que l’on croit décrypter en parcourant les étapes de l’œuvre d’Anne Cindric, à la fois ascétique et désirante, d’une matité de requiem et d’un rococo sans pedirgee. » Jean-Yves Jouannais.

The Gallery Laure Roynette has presented this year : Clémence Veilhan with the exposition "Et les fruits passeront la promesse des fleurs" / And the fruits will go past the promise of flowers", and François Fries with the exposition "Que vois-tu du Mont Fuji?" / "What do you see on the Mount Fuji ?"

In October, 2015, Laure Roynette Gallery will present an exhibition of Romina De Novellis, "To be or not to be" with the Bill Viola's exceptional participation. 
Romina De Novellis has performed, for instance, at Diner des Amis du Palais de Tokyo with her performance "Inferno" in April 2015, or more recently, she performed "UNO" in September 2015, at Espace Culturel Louis Vuitton.

The Gallery follows the work of all of its Artists, especially in their activity beyond the wall : installations, performances. The Gallery is engaged also during the European Night of Museums. 
The work of Anne Cindric has been presented during the forums « 1917, et après ? » at the Centre Pompidou-Metz. The performer Romina de Novellis, participates at the European Night of Museums and at the Nuit blanche.

Publications 

 « Abécédaire de campagne » Anne Cindric par Jean-Yves Jouannais, 2012

External links 
http://sortir.telerama.fr/evenements/expos/jean-baptiste-boyer-les-agneaux-perdus,n5327137.php
https://www.franceculture.fr/emissions/les-carnets-de-la-creation/les-carnets-de-la-creation-jeudi-14-decembre-2017
 Site officiel
 Code Couleur sept-dec 2012 Centre national d'art et de culture Georges-Pompidou :
 Slash.fr : Archives des expositions 
 Inferno Magazine.com : Julie Crenn
 Vu et revue : Une archéologie du contemporain 
 Slash.fr : Exposition Anne Cindric http://slash-paris.com/evenements/anne-cindric-parte-incognita
 Slash.fr : Exposition Marion Davout et Émilie Bazus http://slash-paris.com/evenements/marion-davout-et-emilie-bazus-fairy-tales
 Slash.fr : Exposition Clémence Veilhan "Et les fruits passeront la promesse des fleurs" 
 Slash.fr : Exposition François Fries "Que vois-tu du Mont Fuji ?" 
 Vsd.fr : Exposition du collectif Woda http://www.vsd.fr/contenu-editorial/photo-story/diaporamas/2319-exposition-du-collectif-woda-a-la-galerie-laure-roynette
 Ouvretesyeux.fr : Romina De Novellis http://www.ouvretesyeux.fr/2013/11/11/romina-de-novellis-paris-galerie-laure-roynette-du-1010-au-231113/
 Ouvretesyeux.fr : Clémence Veilhan 
 Libération.fr : Clémence Veilhan "Les filles femmes de Clémence Veilhan" 
 Lunettes Rouges pour Le Monde : Clémence Veilhan "Le discours de la méthode et les jeunes filles en fleur" 
 Chroniques du chapeau noir : Clémence Veilhan "Voler de ses propres Elles" 
 Chroniques du chapeau noir : François Fries "L'hypothèse du paysage" 
 L.Arty Box : Portrait Galerie Laure Roynette http://fr.ulule.com/larty-box/news/le-portrait-galerie-laure-roynette-35450/
 Le Figaro Et Vous : Romina De Novellis : http://www.lefigaro.fr/culture/2015/04/20/03004-20150420ARTFIG00022-la-nuit-de-la-pasteque.php?redirect_premium
 Hermès presents Wanderland : Nicolas Tourte :

References 

Art museums and galleries in Paris